2518 Rutllant, provisional designation , is a stony Flora asteroid from the inner regions of the asteroid belt, approximately 4 kilometers in diameter. It was discovered by Chilean astronomer Carlos Torres at the Cerro El Roble Station of the National Astronomical Observatory in Chile, on 22 March 1974, and named for astronomer Federico Alcina.

Orbit and classification 

Rutllant is a member of the Flora family, one of the largest groups of stony asteroids in the main-belt. It orbits the Sun in the inner main-belt at a distance of 1.9–2.7 AU once every 3 years and 6 months (1,281 days). Its orbit has an eccentricity of 0.17 and an inclination of 6° with respect to the ecliptic. A first precovery was taken at Goethe Link Observatory in 1954, extending the body's observation arc by 20 years prior to its official discovery observation at Cerro El Roble.

Physical characteristics 

Rutllant has been characterized as a stony S-type asteroid.

Rotational lightcurve 

A rotational lightcurve was obtained by American astronomer Brian Warner at his Palmer Divide Observatory, Colorado, in October 2010. The lightcurve gave a well-defined period of  hours with a relatively low brightness variation of 0.12 in magnitude.

Diameter and albedo 

According to the survey carried out by the NEOWISE mission of NASA's Wide-field Infrared Survey Explorer, the asteroid has an outstandingly high albedo of 0.77 with a diameter of 3.2 kilometer, while the Collaborative Asteroid Lightcurve Link (CALL) assumes an albedo of 0.24, derived from the Flora family's largest member and namesake, the asteroid 8 Flora. Consequently, CALL calculates a much larger diameter of 5.9 kilometer, as the lower the albedo (reflectivity), the larger the body's diameter at a constant absolute magnitude (brightness).

Naming 

This minor planet was named in memory of Spanish-born astronomer Federico Alcina (1904–1971), director of the Chilean National Astronomical Observatory (OAN), and professor of mathematics at Federico Santa María Technical University.

Alcina was instrumental for the development of Chilean astronomy, and responsible for a number of critical agreements and decisions, such as moving OAN from Lo Espejo to its current location, for the installment of the Maipú Radio Observatory upon an agreement with UF, for another agreement with UChicago, University of Texas, and later AURA — that resulted in the setup of the CTIO, as well as for an agreement with the former Soviet Academy of Sciences that lead to the building of the Cerro El Roble Station, where this minor planet was discovered. The official naming citation was published by the Minor Planet Center on 26 March 1986.

References

External links 
  
 Lightcurve plot of 2518 Rutllant, Palmer Divide Observatory, B. D. Warner (2010)
 Asteroid Lightcurve Database (LCDB), query form (info )
 Dictionary of Minor Planet Names, Google books
 Asteroids and comets rotation curves, CdR – Observatoire de Genève, Raoul Behrend
 Discovery Circumstances: Numbered Minor Planets (1)-(5000) – Minor Planet Center
 
 

002518
Discoveries by Carlos Torres (astronomer)
Named minor planets
19740322